Precious Ezinna Achiuwa (born September 19, 1999) is a Nigerian professional basketball player for the Toronto Raptors of the National Basketball Association (NBA). He played college basketball for the Memphis Tigers. He finished his high school career at Montverde Academy in Montverde, Florida and was a consensus five-star recruit and McDonald's All-American.

Early life and high school career
Achiuwa was born in Port Harcourt, Nigeria to Nigerian parents of Igbo descent and grew up mainly playing soccer. He started focusing on basketball while in eighth grade, which is when he moved to the United States. As a high school freshman, Achiuwa played basketball for Our Saviour Lutheran School in Centereach, New York. For his next two years, he attended St. Benedict's Preparatory School in Newark, New Jersey. The school had a nationally ranked basketball program and he was teammates with several NCAA Division I recruits. In his junior season, Achiuwa averaged 18.5 points, 10.5 rebounds, 2.9 blocks, and 2.2 steals per game, leading his team to a 28–2 record. He was named to the MaxPreps Junior All-American second team. 

Entering his senior year, Achiuwa transferred to Montverde Academy, a prep school in Montverde, Florida with a successful basketball program that held the No. 1 national ranking in the previous season. He led Montverde with 14 points and 7.2 rebounds per game and helped his team reach the semifinals at GEICO High School Nationals. Achiuwa earned MaxPreps All-American fifth team, USA Today All-USA third team, and USA Today All-USA Florida first team honors. On March 27, 2019, he played for the East team in the McDonald's All-American Game, leading all scorers with 22 points. On April 12, Achiuwa joined the World team at the Nike Hoop Summit.

Recruiting
On May 17, 2019, Achiuwa committed to play college basketball for Memphis under head coach Penny Hardaway. He joined his former Amateur Athletic Union (AAU) teammate, Lester Quinones, and the number one player in the 2019 class, James Wiseman.

College career
In his debut for Memphis, Achiuwa had 14 points and eight rebounds as the Tigers defeated South Carolina State 97–64. Achiuwa scored a season-high 25 points in an 87–86 win over Ole Miss on November 23. As a result, he was named American Athletic Conference player of the week on November 25. He earned conference freshman of the week honors on December 23 after recording 20 points and nine rebounds in a 77–49 victory over Jackson State. At the conclusion of the regular season, Achiuwa was named AAC Player and Freshman of the Year. He averaged 15.8 points, 10.8 rebounds and 1.9 blocks per game as a freshman. He declared for the 2020 NBA draft after his freshman season.

Professional career

Miami Heat (2020–2021)

Achiuwa was selected with the 20th pick in the 2020 NBA draft by the Miami Heat. On November 25, 2020, Achiuwa signed his rookie scale contract with the Heat.

Toronto Raptors (2021–present)
On August 6, 2021, the Toronto Raptors acquired Achiuwa and Goran Dragić from the Heat via a sign-and-trade deal in exchange for Kyle Lowry. On October 20, 2021, on his season debut with the Raptors, Achiuwa had six points, seven rebounds, two assists and a steal in 19 minutes of play in a 96–83 loss to the Washington Wizards. On November 24, 2021, Achiuwa made a career-high three 3-pointers while having 17 points, four rebounds, two assists and a steal in a 126–113 win against the Memphis Grizzlies.

Career statistics

NBA

Regular season

|-
| style="text-align:left;"| 
| style="text-align:left;"|Miami
| 61 || 4 || 12.1 || .544 || .000 || .509 || 3.4 || .5 || .3 || .5 || 5.0
|-
| style="text-align:left;"| 
| style="text-align:left;"|Toronto
| 73 || 28 || 23.6 || .439 || .359 || .595 || 6.5 || 1.1 || .5 || .6 || 9.1
|- class="sortbottom"
| style="text-align:center;" colspan="2"|Career
| 134 || 32 || 18.4 || .468 || .357 || .556 || 5.1 || .8 || .4 || .5 || 7.2

Playoffs

|-
| style="text-align:left;"|2021
| style="text-align:left;"|Miami
| 3 || 0 || 4.0 || .750 || — || .250 || 2.0 || .0 || .0 || .7 || 2.3
|-
| style="text-align:left;"|2022
| style="text-align:left;"|Toronto
| 6 || 1 || 27.8 || .481 || .313 || .600 || 4.8 || 1.0 || .2 || .8 || 10.2
|- class="sortbottom"
| style="text-align:center;" colspan="2"|Career
| 9 || 1 || 19.9 || .500 || .313 || .500 || 3.9 || .7 || .1 || .8 || 7.6

College

|-
| style="text-align:left;"|2019–20
| style="text-align:left;"|Memphis
| 31 || 31 || 30.4 || .493 || .325 || .599 || 10.8 || 1.0 || 1.1 || 1.9 || 15.8
|- class="sortbottom"
| style="text-align:center;" colspan="2"|Career
| 31 || 31 || 30.4 || .493 || .325 || .599 || 10.8 || 1.0 || 1.1 || 1.9 || 15.8

Personal life
Achiuwa's older brother, God'sgift Achiuwa, played college basketball for St. John's from 2011 to 2014. His mother, Eunice, and father, Donatus, are both Pentecostal ministers. In addition to God'sgift, he has two other brothers, God'swill and Promise, and two sisters, Grace and Peace.

References

External links
 Memphis Tigers bio

1999 births
Living people
Basketball players at the 2020 Summer Olympics
McDonald's High School All-Americans
Memphis Tigers men's basketball players
Miami Heat draft picks
Miami Heat players
Montverde Academy alumni
National Basketball Association players from Nigeria
Nigerian expatriate basketball people in Canada
Nigerian expatriate basketball people in the United States
Nigerian men's basketball players
Olympic basketball players of Nigeria
Power forwards (basketball)
Sportspeople from Port Harcourt
St. Benedict's Preparatory School alumni
Toronto Raptors players